Norway's entry into the Eurovision Song Contest 1995 was "Nocturne" by Secret Garden. It went on to win that year's Eurovision Song Contest in Dublin, marking Norway's second first-place finish in its history in the Contest.

Before Eurovision

Melodi Grand Prix 1995

Competing entries

Semi-finals 
Nine semi-finals were held weekly between 14 January and 18 March 1995. Two songs competed in each semi-final with the winner from each semi-final qualifying for the final, along with one of the losing songs which were given wildcards.

Final 
The final was held at the studios of the Norwegian Broadcasting Corporation in Oslo, hosted by Petter Nome. Ten songs took part with the winner being chosen by voting from regional juries, a jury based in Dublin consisting of previous Irish ESC winners and televoting. 
Other participants included Geir Rønning, who would later represent Finland in the Eurovision Song Contest 2005.

At Eurovision

Voting

Notes

References

External links 
Full national final on nrk.no

1995
Countries in the Eurovision Song Contest 1995
1995
Eurovision
Eurovision